Sonsogor is the highest peak in the state of Goa, India, at an elevation of  above sea level. It is located at the trijunction of Sattari taluka, North Goa district, Goa; and Khanapur taluka, Belagavi district, and Joida taluka, Uttara Kannada district, Karnataka state, India. It is also called Sonsogodd, Darsingha or Darsinga. It is a part of the Western Ghats mountain range.

Highest points of Indian states and union territories
Mountains of Goa
Geography of North Goa district